Thomas Russell (23 November 1909 – February 1975) was a Scottish professional footballer who played in the Scottish League for Cowdenbeath and Rangers as a left back. He also played in the Football League for Newcastle United. After his retirement, Russell became secretary at Cowdenbeath.

Personal life 
Russell lost both his legs in 1971.

Career statistics

Honours 

 Cowdenbeath Hall of Fame

References 

Scottish footballers
Cowdenbeath F.C. players
Scottish Football League players
1909 births
People from Cowdenbeath
Association football fullbacks
Rangers F.C. players
Newcastle United F.C. players
English Football League players
Darlington Town F.C. players
Cowdenbeath F.C. non-playing staff
Scottish amputees
1975 deaths
Association footballers with limb difference
Scottish disabled sportspeople
Footballers from Fife